The murder of Umesh Kolhe, a pharmacist from Amravati in the state of Maharashtra in India, was carried out by two men by stabbing on 21 June 2022. The police arrested several people, who according to them, admitted to killing Kolhe for what he posted about Nupur Sharma, who was involved in the 2022 Prophet remarks row.  The police released CCTV footage that showed the assailants following Kolhe around 10 p.m. on June 21. The National Investigation Agency (NIA) had take over the probe of the killing to assess any possible links to the Udaipur murder.

Murder
On June 21, 2022, pharmacist Umesh Prahladrao Kolhe was stabbed to death while returning home on his scooter after closing his pharmacy ‘Amit Medical Store’ near Ghantaghar in Shyam chowk area of Amravati, Maharashtra. Kolhe's son Sanket and his wife Vaishnavi were accompanying him on another scooter. Kolhe was taken to a nearby hospital but died while receiving medical treatment.

Investigation
The police arrested seven men, including prime accused Irfan Khan, for Kolhe's murder all of whom are residents of Amravati. The police was able to locate the knife allegedly used to kill Kolhe.
 
Investigators are also investigating his social media post supporting BJP’s Nupur Sharma who had made controversial comments about Muhammad.

See also 
 Murder of Rinku Sharma
 Kamlesh Tiwari
 Murder of Samuel Paty
 Murder of Kishan Bharvad
 Murder of Kanhaiya Lal
 2022 Muhammad remarks controversy
 Islam and blasphemy
 Islam and violence
 List of Islamist terrorist attacks

References

2022 crimes in India
2020s in Maharashtra
Amravati
Crime in Maharashtra
Deaths by person in India
June 2022 crimes in Asia
June 2022 events in India
Islamic terrorism in India
Islamic terrorist incidents in 2022
Stabbing attacks in 2022
Terrorist incidents in India in 2022
Stabbing attacks in Asia
Deaths by stabbing in India
People murdered in Maharashtra
Murder in India
Religiously motivated violence in India
Violence against Hindus in India